Jordan Reaves (born January 25, 1990) is a Canadian football defensive lineman for the Edmonton Elks of the Canadian Football League (CFL). Reaves originally played basketball for the Brandon Bobcats of Canadian Interuniversity Sport before making the switch to football.

College career

Brandon University
Reaves played from 2010-2014 for the Brandon University Bobcats men's basketball team.

Professional career

Winnipeg Blue Bombers
Reaves was signed by his hometown Winnipeg Blue Bombers on April 9, 2015 following workouts in Winnipeg and at the 2015 Edmonton Regional Combine. He played in two pre-season games as a wide receiver and recorded one catch for six yards. Reaves was part of the team's final cuts on June 20, 2016.

Saskatchewan Roughriders
After spending the 2015 CFL season unsigned by a CFL team, Reaves signed with the Saskatchewan Roughriders on January 29, 2016. While listed as a defensive back, Reaves practiced as a defensive lineman through training camp and upon making the team, he dressed in his first regular season game on June 30, 2016 as a backup defensive end. He played in five games for the Roughriders in 2016 and recorded two special teams tackles. He was released during training camp the following year on June 18, 2017. On May 20, 2018, he re-signed with Saskatchewan for 2018 training camp. Reaves signed a one-year contract extension with the Roughriders on December 21, 2020.

Edmonton Elks

Reaves joined the Edmonton Elks in free agency on February 15, 2022.

Personal life
Jordan is the youngest son of former Winnipeg Blue Bomber running back Willard Reaves, who played with the team for five years and was a member of the 72nd Grey Cup winning team. Jordan is also the younger brother of Ryan Reaves, a professional hockey player and right wing for the Minnesota Wild of the National Hockey League.

In February 2008, Reaves was charged with possession for the purpose of trafficking, which he pleaded guilty to in December 2008, and received a conditional sentence, one year of supervised probation, and was not allowed to possess a weapon for 10-years. In 2016, Reaves was charged with one count of drug trafficking, but was set free on bail, after a routine traffic stop discovered cocaine in his possession. His trial in Winnipeg began in November 2017, where he pleaded his innocence.
On January 24, 2018, he was acquitted of drug trafficking charges after the judge determined there was a lack of evidence.

References

External links
Saskatchewan Roughriders profile 
Brandon Bobcats profile

1990 births
Living people
Canadian football defensive backs
Canadian football defensive linemen
Players of Canadian football from Manitoba
Saskatchewan Roughriders players
Canadian football people from Winnipeg
Winnipeg Blue Bombers players
Canadian people of African-American descent
Black Canadian players of Canadian football